Cape Charles is a headland, or cape, in Northampton County, Virginia. Located at the southern tip of Northampton County, it forms the southern tip of the Delmarva Peninsula and the northern side of the entrance to the Chesapeake Bay. Cape Charles was named in honor of Charles I of England, the second son of King James I and his eventual successor to the thrones of England, Scotland, and Ireland. 

Cape Henry, which forms the southern side of the entrance to the Chesapeake Bay, and Cape Charles are collectively known as the Virginia Capes.

See also
Cape Charles, Virginia
Cape Henry
Virginia Capes

Notes

References
Merriam-Webster's Geographical Dictionary, Third Edition. Springfield, Massachusetts: Merriam-Webster Incorporated, 1997. .

Headlands of Virginia
Landforms of Northampton County, Virginia